Gavintra Photijak, nicknamed Gam (born 24 December 1986 in Nongkhai, Thailand) is a Thai television actress and beauty pageant titleholder who has competed in the Miss Universe.

On May 24, 2008, she competed in the Miss Thailand Universe 2008 pageant held in Bangkok where she won and was crowned by reigning Miss Thailand Universe 2007 Farung Yuthithum

She graduate bachelor's degree from Bangkok University.

Pageantry
She represented Thailand in the Miss Universe 2008 pageant held in Nha Trang, Vietnam, where her Muay Thai inspired costume won the Best National Costume Award. However, she did not place in the Top 15. The pageant was won by Dayana Mendoza, of Venezuela.

Photijak is the fourth Thai woman ever won the Best National Costume Award in the Miss Universe pageant, the first being Saengduan Manwong in 1969, Porntip Nakhirunkanok in 1988 and Chananporn Rosjan in 2005.

Screen credits

Television (Channel 7)

External links
Official site of Miss Thailand Universe 2008

1986 births
Living people
Gavintra Photijak
Miss Universe 2008 contestants
Gavintra Photijak